Modern Love Hyderabad is an Indian Telugu-language romantic anthology streaming television series produced by Elahe Hiptoola and directed by Nagesh Kukunoor, Venkatesh Maha, Uday Gurrala and Devika Bahudhanam. It stars Nithya Menen, Abijeet, Aadhi Pinisetty, Ritu Varma, Malvika Nair, Suhasini Maniratnam, Revathi, Naresh, Ulka Gupta, Naresh Agastya, and Komalee Prasad in the lead roles.

Modern Love Hyderabad is set in Hyderabad and is based on the American television series Modern Love which itself is based on the weekly column of the same name published by The New York Times. The series premiered on 8 July 2022 on Amazon Prime Video to positive reviews from critics.

Cast

Episode 1 
 Nithya Menen as Noori Hussain
 Revathi as Meharunnisa, Noori's mother
 Krishna Teja as Prakash, neighbour of Noori
 Mayank Parak as Auto driver Hussain
 Pradeep Rudra as Vinay, Noori's colleague.

Episode 2 
 Aadhi Pinisetty as Dr.Uday
 Ritu Varma as Renuka "Renu"
 C. V. L.Narasimha Rao as Renuka's father
 Geetha Daasyam as Renuka's mother
 Sree. M. Nivaas as Uday's Father
 Tripura. K as Uday's mother
 Zee Aly as Naznim, Renuka's best friend
 Tejaswini Bhattaru as Preeti, Rahul's wife; Renuka's ex Boyfriend.

Episode 3 
 Suhasini Maniratnam as Gangamma
 Naresh Agastya as Rohan Durvraj 'RD'/'Rohan' AKA Ramulu.

Episode 4 
 Abijeet Duddala as Ashwin
 Malvika Nair as Vandana Bharadwaj 'Vinnie'
 Sanjay Swaroop as Vinnie's father 
 Pramodini as Vinnie's mother.
 Bindu Chandramouli as Sakshi 
 Charani as Simran

Episode 5 
 Naresh as K. Sreedhar
 Ulka Gupta as Sneha
 Anirudh Pavithran as Jai, Sneha's love interest 
 Divyavani as Jyothika, Sreedhar's wife
 Kruthika Roy Theresa as Raashi, Sneha's colleague 
 Eashaan Gandakam as Balu, a tech enthusiast who helps Sreeder spy on Sneha

Episode 6 
 Komalee Prasad as Indu
 Rag Mayur as Tarun, one side lover of Indu.
 Priyanka Kolluru as Subha, Indu's best friend.
 Pawani Karanam as Ayesha
 Bhavana Sagi as Srilekha
 Karthikesh as Karn
 Santhosh Balakrishna as Vivek, ex-lover of Indu.
 Srinivas Bogireddy as Narasimha, Indu's father
 Ankith Koyya as Aadi (Cameo role).

Episodes 
First season of the series has six episodes.

Production 
Modern Love Hyderabad was filmed between September and November 2021. Speaking to The Hindu Elahe Hiptoola states that producing an anthology for a digital platform was not very different from producing a film. "Ultimately, it is like organising a baraat every day. No one will tell you that the food is good, but someone will complain namak kam tha (the salt was less). For cinema, my task begins with raising funds and ends with finding distributors. In this case, Prime Video gave me enough freedom and also gently reminded me of regulations when needed. For example, I did not know that we cannot shoot with kids beyond 7p.m. I had not followed such rules during the making of Rockford or Dhanak. This was a learning experience." Director Uday Gurrala told News18: "In my story titled ‘What Clown Wrote This!’, you will see universal themes but from a distinctly Telugu lens and that's what makes it so interesting. We’ve delved deep into the psyche of the Telugu man (and woman) to understand what makes today's generation tick".

Release 
The series was released on Amazon Prime Video on 8 July 2022.

Reception 
Janani K of India Today rated the series 2.5 out of 5 stars and wrote "The show aims to tug at our heartstrings, but settles for more melodrama". Saibal Chatterjee of NDTV rated the series 2.5 out of 5 stars and wrote "Revathy, outstanding as ever, conveys a range of emotions with mere glances and gestures. Nithya Menen is luminous".

See also
 Modern Love Mumbai, Mumbai chapter of Modern Love

References

External links 
 

Amazon Prime Video original programming
Telugu-language television shows
Telugu-language web series
2022 Indian television series debuts
2022 web series debuts
Indian drama web series
Indian comedy web series
Anthology web series
Indian anthology television series
Indian television series based on American television series
Television shows set in Hyderabad, India